Edem Mortotsi (born 16 April 1993) is a Ghanaian football coach and former player who serves as the head fitness coach for Tanzanian club Young Africans.

Early life
Mortotsi was born in Accra, Ghana and emigrated to Canada at a young age. While in high school Mortotsi played with KC Trojans from the U12 level to the U18s. He then attended university at Northern Alberta Institute of Technology, where he played soccer.

Club career

FC Edmonton
After playing with the reserve side of FC Edmonton Mortotsi signed with the first-team for the 2013 season. He then made his debut for the club on 6 April 2013 against the Fort Lauderdale Strikers in which he came on in the 79th minute for Michael Cox as FC Edmonton drew the match 1–1.

Edmonton Victoria
In 2017, Mortotsi played for Alberta Major Soccer League side Edmonton Victoria, scoring two goals in ten appearances.

Edmonton Green & Gold
At the end of the 2017 season, Mortotsi joined the Edmonton Green & Gold, making one appearance and scoring one goal that year. He remained with the Green & Gold in the 2018 season, making five appearances.

Return to FC Edmonton
On 31 January 2019, Mortotsi returned to FC Edmonton. That season, he made eighteen league appearances. On 27 November 2019, Mortotsi re-signed with Edmonton for the 2020 season. In August 2020, he suffered an undisclosed season-ending injury while preparing for the shortened 2020 CPL season.

Coaching career
On 27 January 2021, Mortotsi signed with Tanzanian Premier League side Young Africans as the club's head fitness coach.

Career statistics
Statistics accurate as of 2 November 2014

References

External links
 

1993 births
Living people
Association football midfielders
Ghanaian footballers
Canadian soccer players
Footballers from Accra
Soccer players from Edmonton
Ghanaian emigrants to Canada
Naturalized citizens of Canada
Black Canadian soccer players
Ghanaian expatriate footballers
Canadian expatriate soccer players
Ghanaian expatriate sportspeople in Tanzania
Canadian expatriate sportspeople in Tanzania
Northern Alberta Institute of Technology alumni
FC Edmonton players
North American Soccer League players
Canadian Premier League players
Canadian soccer coaches
Canadian expatriate soccer coaches